Thea Tsulukiani (born 21 January 1975) is a Georgian politician who is currently serving as Deputy Prime Minister and Minister of Culture, Sport and Youth of Georgia. She previously served as Minister of Justice from October 2012 to October 2020. Prior to her ministerial roles, she ran as a candidate for the Free Democrats (Georgia), and was elected as Member of Parliament for Nazaladevi, a single- mandate constituency of the capital, with 72% of the vote. She resigned on 29 September 2020, effective 1 October. Since December, 2020 she is a member of Parliament of Georgia.

Tsulukiani has 10 years of experience as a lawyer at the European Court of Human Rights in Strasbourg (ECHR) where at the same time she served as a member of the Committee for Rules of Court and as a rapporteur on the cases examined by single-judge compositions.

Tsulukiani holds MPA degree from École Nationale d'Administration (ENA) in France (Averroès 1998-2000). She also holds the degree in international law and international relations and a diploma from the Academy of Diplomacy of the Ministry of Foreign Affairs of Georgia.

She is the chairperson of 8 Inter-agency Councils in the Government of Georgia, among them the Criminal Justice Reform Council, the Anti-corruption Council, the Anti-drug, Anti-torture and Anti-trafficking Councils as well as the State Commission on Migration Issues and the Inter-agency Commission for Free and Fair Elections.

In March 2021, Tsulukiani was appointed Minister of Culture and Deputy PM.

References

External links
Meeting with French media representatives (11.12.2012)
 “Georgia can’t turn a blind eye to broken laws” (06.06.2013)
Justice minister pledges freedom from political interference (20.09.2013)
Minister of Justice on BBC (29.10.2013)
« Visa liberalisation is what will bring us closer to the EU » (17.10.2014)
"Ukrinform": Министр юстиции Грузии Тея Цулукиани в интервью Укринформу рассказала о реформах и о том, почему нету дружбы между Москвой и Тбилиси (28.05.2015)
Tea Tsulukiani: EEU doesn’t hinder Armenia-Georgia friendship (24.06. 2015)
Changing Georgia in a Changing Europe
Discourse: ‘Our philosophy is to have a good system’
Why Georgia prioritises co-creation of public services

1975 births
Living people
Lawyers from Tbilisi
Free Democrats (Georgia) politicians
Politicians from Tbilisi
Government ministers of Georgia (country)
Tbilisi State University alumni
École nationale d'administration alumni
Women lawyers from Georgia (country)
Women government ministers of Georgia (country)
21st-century women politicians from Georgia (country)
21st-century politicians from Georgia (country)
Female justice ministers